Rajjaprabha Dam or Cheow Lan Dam is a multi-purpose dam in Ban Cheow Lan, Tambon Khao Phang, Ban Ta Khun District, Surat Thani Province. Its purpose is electricity generation, irrigation, flood control, and fishing. Construction started on 9 February 1982. It was inaugurated on 30 September 1987. King Bhumibol Adulyadej gave the dam the name "Rajjaprabha", meaning 'light of the kingdom'.

Rajjaprabha is a rockfill dam with clay core. It is 95 meters high, 761 meters long, with a capacity of 5,639 million m3 of water, covering 185 km2. The power plant houses three 80 MW generators, totalling 240 MW of generating capacity.

The lake attracts over 70,000 tourists every year. Due to its scenery, it has been called "Guilin, Thailand". Much of the lake is under the supervision of Khao Sok National Park.

See also
Cheow Lan Lake

References 

Dams in Thailand
Hydroelectric power stations in Thailand